Harsha Khandeparkar (born 26 October 1992) is an Indian model and television actress. Harsha has appeared in several television shows and a Marathi movie. Harsha has been featured in several ad-films for popular brands, some of which include Axis Bank, Hypercity Print and PNG Jewellery.

Personal life 

Born and brought up in Goa, Harsha has completed her schooling from St. Xavier's College, Mapusa, Goa and later shifted to Pune to complete her graduation in BSc. Zoology from Fergusson College.

Acting career in television 

Soon after her graduation, Harsha auditioned for then the upcoming show on 9X (TV channel) titled as "Neelanjana". She was selected and called for look test to Mumbai. Harsha bagged the titular role of the show, hence playing "Neelanjana" in the show. Later Harsha went on to play lead one of the lead character, Rajshree Goradia, opposite Manish Raisinghan in the show Hum Dono Hain Alag Alag aired on STAR One in the year 2009. Show also starred Yash Pandit and Dimple Jhangiani in lead roles.

Not just restricting herself to positive lead roles, Harsha played the grey character of "Sanchi" in one of the Colors TV's longest running show Uttaran. Harsha had entered the show along with co-actor Sharad Kelkar, who played her brother in the show. Her role lasted for about the six months in show. Later Harsha took up character of Anuradha Dewan in popular show Pyaar Ka Dard Hai Meetha Meetha Pyaara Pyaara under the banner of Rajshri Productions which aired on Star Plus.

Harsha acted as main lead Aastha in Khwabon Ke Darmiyan which is a hit-tele serial which telecasted on Doordarshan National for that role she won more TRPs and viewers.
She has also featured in several episodic shows including CID (Indian TV series), Code Red (Indian TV series) and Love by Chance.

Since August 2020, she is portraying the role of Mrs. Keerti Naksh Singhania in Star Plus's Yeh Rishta Kya Kehlata Hai.

Filmography

Films

Television

References 

Indian television actresses
1989 births
Living people